The East European Plain (also called the Russian Plain, or historically the Sarmatic Plain) is a vast interior plain extending east of the North European Plain, and comprising several plateaus stretching roughly from 25 degrees longitude eastward. It includes Volhynian-Podolian Upland on its westernmost fringe, the Central Russian Upland, and, on the eastern border, encompasses the Volga Upland. The plain includes also a series of major river basins such as the Dnepr Basin, the Oka–Don Lowland, and the Volga Basin. At the southeastern point of the East European Plain are the Caucasus and Crimean mountain ranges. Together with the North European Plain (covering much of Belgium, the Netherlands, Denmark, Germany and Poland), and covering the Baltic states (Estonia, Latvia and Lithuania), European Russia, Belarus, Ukraine, Moldova, southeastern Romania, and, at its southernmost point, the Danubian Plain in Northern Bulgaria (including Ludogorie and Southern Dobruja), it constitutes the majority of the Great European Plain (European Plain), the greatest mountain-free part of the European landscape.

Boundaries
 West: Baltic Sea, Oder and Lusatian Neisse, Sudetenland, Carpathians (Outer Western Carpathians, Outer Eastern Carpathians, Southern Carpathians, Serbian Carpathians).
 South: Balkan Mountains, Black Sea, Crimean Mountains, Caucasus, The Caspian Sea and the Sea of Azov, Ustyurt Plateau.
 East: Ural Mountains and Turan Depression.
 North: White Sea, Barents Sea, Kara Sea, Scandinavian Mountains.

Regional subdivisions
Belarus
Belarusian Ridge
Polesia (Belarus, Ukraine)
Bulgaria
Danubian Plain (Bulgaria) (southern portion of the Lower Danubian Plane)
Estonia
Kazakhstan (European part)
Latvia
Lithuania
Poland
Roztocze
Mazovian Lowland
Romania / Moldova
Moldavian Plateau (Moldova, Romania, Ukraine)
Wallachian Plain (northern portion of the Lower Danubian Plane)
Russia (European part)
Timan Ridge
Northern Ridge (Uvaly)
Mari Depression
Valdai Hills
Smolensk–Moscow Upland (Russia, Belarus)
Central Russian Upland (Russia, Ukraine)
Oka–Don Lowland
Volga Upland
 Obshchy Syrt
Caspian Depression
Ukraine
Sian Lowland
Volhynian-Podolian Upland
Podolian Plateau
Polesian Lowland
Dnieper Upland
Kyiv Mountains
Central Upland
Black Sea Lowland
Azov Upland / Donets Ridge

Other major landforms
The following major landform features are within the East European Plain (listed generally from north to south). 
 North Russian Lowlands
 Baltic Uplands 
 Belarusian Ridge 
 Kuma–Manych Depression
 Bugulma-Belebey Upland
 Vyatskie Uvaly

Largest rivers
Volga River
Danube
Ural River
Vistula
Dnieper River
Don River (Russia)
Pechora River
Kama River
Oka River
Belaya River
Daugava
Neman River
Pregolya River

See also
West Siberian Plain, the other major plain of Russia
Explorers of Siberia
Great Russian Regions

References

External links

 East European Plain at Ukrainian Soviet Encyclopedia
 East European Plain at Great Soviet Encyclopedia